The International Filing Company was a manufacturer of filing supplies for the printing industry and several other businesses. They manufactured products such as filing folders, radiology jackets and preservers, labels, expansion pockets, and indexes.

IFC also manufactured Barkley, Century Index, and Redweld certified products.

On April 14, 2010, IFC announced that, due to unforeseen circumstances, the business (located in both Hattiesburg, MS and Anaheim, CA) would be laying off employees and closing.  Two days later, the business laid off over 300 employees and shuttered its doors.

Products
Folders
Press board
End tab
Top tab
Classification
File jackets
Radiology
X-Ray jackets
Category insert jackets
Negative preservers
X-Ray mailers
Indexes
Indexes
Dividers
File backs
Expansion pockets
Expansion pockets
CarryPac
Labels & Accessories
Fasteners
Pockets
Labels

References

Manufacturing companies of the United States
Companies based in Mississippi